School Education Department is a department of Government of Punjab, Pakistan. The functions of the department are to perform legislation, policy formulation and planning of primary, middle, secondary and higher secondary education and maintain standards of education in these fields.

Attached Departments

Punjab Education Assessment System 
Punjab Education Assessment System (PEAS) assess student's learning outcomes and produces evidence on the key factors that impact learning.

Autonomous Bodies

Punjab Curriculum and Textbook Board 
Punjab Curriculum and Textbook Board was established in 1962 as West Pakistan Textbook Board. Its functions are curriculum development, implementation of educational policies of the Government, publication of textbooks and production of supplementary reading material relating to textbooks.

Punjab Examination Commission 

Punjab Examination Commission is an autonomous to assess and examine students’ learning achievements particularly of grade 5 and 8.

Punjab Education Foundation 

The Punjab Education Foundation was established in 1991 as an autonomous statutory body to encourage and promote education in the private sector operating on non-profit basis.

The Punjab Daanish Schools and Centers of Excellence Authority 

Management of Daanish Schools.

Special Institutions

Sadiq Public School

See also 
 Ministry of Federal Education and Professional Training
 Education in Pakistan
 Higher education department (Punjab, Pakistan)
 Special education department (Punjab, Pakistan)
 Literacy & non-formal basic education department (Punjab, Pakistan)
 Punjab Education Foundation

References

External links
 School Education Department
 Punjab Education Foundation
 Punjab Curriculum and Textbook Board
 Punjab Examination Commission
 Daanish Schools
 Punjab Education Assessment System
 Sadiq Public School

Departments of Government of Punjab, Pakistan
Education in Punjab, Pakistan
Punjab, Pakistan